Raamsdonk is a village in the province of North Brabant, Netherlands. It is located in the municipality of Geertruidenberg, about 15 km northeast of Breda.

Toponymy 
Raamsdonk (as "Dunc") is mentioned for the first time in 1253 as Ramesdunc and 1330 as Raemsdonc. A "dunc" or "dark" is a sand hill in a marshy area. The " Raams " prefix may indicate the presence of a certain type of plant, the wild garlic. However, it may also be the name of a person.

History 
In 1609, the St. Lambert church became part of the Reformed Church. In 1611, the first pastor came. 

The Catholic people were allowed, in 1690, to establish a church in a barn. 
In the hamlet Waspikse the Benedenkerk. In 1787, another church in a barn was installed in Raamsdonk. This church was dedicated to Saint-Bavo and was in Bergenstraat. In 1798, however, Catholics demanded to return to the St. Lambert church.  They did not succeed but received a sum of money in compensation. The barn church served the community until 1888. Then a new monumental St. Bavo Church, was built according to the plans of the architect Carl Weber. 
It is located in the present village.

At Raamsdonk until about 1850 existed a small French community.

Raamsdonk was a separate municipality until 1997, when it became part of Geertruidenberg.

Gallery

References

Municipalities of the Netherlands disestablished in 1997
Populated places in North Brabant
Former municipalities of North Brabant
Geertruidenberg